Gemerský Sad  is a village and municipality in Revúca District in the Banská Bystrica Region of Slovakia.

History
It arose in 1964 for the union of Mikolčany and Nováčany in one Municipality. Mikolčany was first mentioned in 1337 (1337 Mykoucha, 1340 Mykocha, 1351 Mykochan, 1486 Mykolchan)  when it belonged to feudatoris Zachy. In 1427 King Ladislav established here some Székelys. In 1582 it was destroyed by Turks. Nováčany was first mentioned in 1258 (1258 Zahy, 1337 Noztre, 1427 Naztrad, 1486 Nostray, 1563 Nowaczan) when it belonged to local Lords Zahy. After it passed to Giczey local feudatories. From 1938 to 1945 both the villages were annexed by Hungary.

Genealogical resources

The records for genealogical research are available at the state archive "Statny Archiv in Kosice, Slovakia"

 Roman Catholic church records (births/marriages/deaths): 1779-1898 (parish B)
 Reformated church records (births/marriages/deaths): 1763-1900 (parish B)

See also
 List of municipalities and towns in Slovakia

External links
https://web.archive.org/web/20080111223415/http://www.statistics.sk/mosmis/eng/run.html 
http://www.gemerskysad.ou.sk/
Surnames of living people in Gemersky Sad

Villages and municipalities in Revúca District